Novozybkovsky District is an administrative and municipal district (raion), one of the twenty-seven in Bryansk Oblast, Russia. It is located in the west of the oblast and bordered by Gordeyevsky and Krasnogorsky District in the north, Klintsovsky in the east, Zlynkovsky and Klimovsky in the south, and Homel region of Belarus in the west. Its administrative center is the town of Novozybkov (which is not administratively a part of the district). Population:  14,170 (2002 Census);

Ecological problems 
As a result of the Chernobyl disaster on April 26, 1986, part of the territory of Bryansk Oblast has been contaminated with radionuclides (mainly Gordeyevsky, Klimovsky, Klintsovsky, Krasnogorsky, Surazhsky, and Novozybkovsky Districts). In 1999, some 226,000 people lived in areas with the contamination level above 5 Curie/km2, representing approximately 16% of the oblast's population.

Administrative and municipal status
Within the framework of administrative divisions, Novozybkovsky District is one of the twenty-seven in the oblast. The town of Novozybkov serves as its administrative center, despite being incorporated separately as an urban administrative okrug—an administrative unit with the status equal to that of the districts.

As a municipal division, the district is incorporated as Novozybkovsky Municipal District. Novozybkov Urban Administrative Okrug is incorporated separately from the district as Novozybkov Urban Okrug.

Notable residents 

 Nikolay Goloded (1894, Staryy Krivets village – 1937), Belarusian Soviet statesman

References

Notes

Sources

Districts of Bryansk Oblast
